Frederick Jacob Reagan Heebe (August 25, 1922 – August 10, 2014) was a United States district judge of the United States District Court for the Eastern District of Louisiana.

Education and career

Born in Gretna in Jefferson Parish, Louisiana, Heebe received a Bachelor of Arts degree from Tulane University in 1943 and was a captain in the United States Army towards the end of World War II from 1945 to 1946. He received a Bachelor of Laws from Tulane University Law School in 1949 and was in private practice in Gretna from 1949 to 1958. He was a member from 1958 to 1960 of the Jefferson Parish Council. He was a judge of Division B of the 24th Judicial District Court in Jefferson Parish from 1961 to 1966.

Federal judicial service

On February 16, 1966, Heebe was nominated by President Lyndon B. Johnson to a seat on the United States District Court for the Eastern District of Louisiana vacated by Judge Frank Burton Ellis. Heebe was confirmed by the United States Senate on March 25, 1966 and received his commission the following day. He served as Chief Judge from 1972 to 1992, assuming senior status on August 26, 1992. Heebe died on August 10, 2014, in Metairie, Louisiana.

See also
 List of United States federal judges by longevity of service

References

Sources
 

1922 births
2014 deaths
People from Gretna, Louisiana
Military personnel from Louisiana
Parish jurors and commissioners in Louisiana
Louisiana state court judges
Judges of the United States District Court for the Eastern District of Louisiana
United States district court judges appointed by Lyndon B. Johnson
20th-century American judges
Tulane University Law School alumni
United States Army officers
Louisiana Democrats
United States Army personnel of World War II